Kang Min-soo (born 14 February 1986) is a South Korean football player who plays at center back for Incheon United. He also played for Chunnam Dragons, Jeju United, Jeonbuk Hyundai Motors, Suwon Bluewings and Ulsan Hyundai.

He was a member of South Korea Olympic football team and South Korea national football team.

His first match is 2008 Summer Olympics football qualification second round against Yemen U-23 football team at 28 February 2007. And his international debut match is Friendly match against Netherlands at 2 June 2007.

Career statistics

Club

International

Statistics correct as of matches played 14 February 2010

Honours
Ulsan Hyundai
 AFC Champions League (1): 2012

References

External links

Kang Min-soo – National Team Stats at KFA 

1986 births
Living people
Association football central defenders
South Korean footballers
South Korea international footballers
Jeonnam Dragons players
Jeonbuk Hyundai Motors players
Jeju United FC players
Suwon Samsung Bluewings players
Ulsan Hyundai FC players
Gimcheon Sangmu FC players
K League 1 players
2007 AFC Asian Cup players
2010 FIFA World Cup players
Footballers at the 2008 Summer Olympics
Olympic footballers of South Korea
Sportspeople from Gyeonggi Province